is the eighth studio album by Japanese idol duo Wink, released by Polystar on April 25, 1992. It features the singles "Tsuioku no Heroine" and "Matenrō Museum". Also included in the album are Japanese-language covers of Hot Chocolate's "Brother Louie", Meisler's "We Can Make It", Billie Hughes' "Love Is an Art", Roxanne's "Burning Through the Night", and KC and the Sunshine Band's "That's the Way (I Like It)".

The album peaked at No. 11 on Oricon's albums chart and sold over 58,000 copies.

Track listing 
All lyrics are written by Neko Oikawa, except where indicated; all music is arranged by Satoshi Kadokura, except where indicated.

Charts

Footnotes

References

External links 
 
 
 

1992 albums
Wink (duo) albums
Japanese-language albums